The Negeri Sembilan State Executive Council is the executive authority of the Government of Negeri Sembilan, Malaysia. The Council comprises the Menteri Besar, appointed by the Yang di-Pertuan Besar on the basis that he is able to command a majority in the Negeri Sembilan State Legislative Assembly, a number of members made up of members of the Assembly, the State Secretary, the State Legal Adviser and the State Financial Officer.

This Council is similar in structure and role to the Cabinet of Malaysia, while being smaller in size. As federal and state responsibilities differ, there are a number of portfolios that differ between the federal and state governments.

Members of the Council are selected by the Menteri Besar, appointed by the Yang di-Pertuan Besar. The Council has no ministry, but instead a number of committees; each committee will take care of certain state affairs, activities and departments. Members of the Council are always the chair of a committee.

Members

Full members 

As at 24 May 2018, the Council comprises:

Ex officio members

See also 
 Yang di-Pertuan Besar of Negeri Sembilan
 List of Menteris Besar of Negeri Sembilan
 Negeri Sembilan State Legislative Assembly

References

External links 
 Negeri Sembilan State Government

Politics of Negeri Sembilan
Negeri Sembilan